Universidad de Dagupan (formerly Colegio de Dagupan, Computronix College) is a private non-sectarian research college located in Dagupan, Philippines.

Computronix College
 December 22, 1992: the school obtained college status registered with the Securities and Exchange Commission and began offering Bachelor of Science in Computer Engineering.
 1993: with the continuing increase of enrollment, the college opened the Felisa Arzadon Memorial Extension to provide more classrooms for the growing student population. It also offered BS Accountancy, BS Commerce major in Management Information Systems, AB Major in Computer Teaching and BS Aeronautics Engineering.
 1994: The Science Centrum was inaugurated, it housed all laboratories and computer facilities of the College. It was recognized as a virtual landmark in Dagupan. During this year the Liberal Arts, Commerce and Accountancy (LCA) building was also opened.
 1995: the Engineering building located behind the Science Centrum was built.
 1996: located beside the Science Centrum, a new school campus came into being. Among the facilities added to the College were the Campus Quadrangle, a basketball/volleyball court, brickyard park, the College Printing Press and the Administration Building.
 In recognition of the noble achievements of this institution, Colegio de Dagupan was hailed as Champion in the search for the Cleanest and Greenest Higher Educational Institution (City Level).
 1998: the VPA-CS building was built. It houses spacious rooms complete with Monaco student chairs, electric fans, cinema scope, chalkboards and tiled lobby areas. It also opened a new and bigger library equipped with air conditioners, Internet Terminals, video library, CD-ROM equipped computers and other innovative facilities located at the Administration Building.
 1999: with the exceptional cooperation shown by the Administration and students, the College was proclaimed First Place in the entire Region I for its Traffic Alleviation Program (Pila System). The competition participated in was "The Search for the Most Outstanding School Project" undertaken through the spirit of Voluntarism, and the judges included heads of the different government regional offices i.e., NEDA and CHED. In the same year, Ronald Bautista, a BSECE student, was the National Grand Champion in RPN 9 Battle of the Brains Year 7 defeating the bets from UP-Diliman and PUP- Sta. Mesa.
 2000: The new LCA Building was inaugurated. This building had an air-conditioned Chapel, a Clinic, a bigger Audio-Visual Room (AVR), HRM Laboratory, Offices and a number of classrooms.
 2001: installed an elevator in the LCA Building.

Colegio de Dagupan

 2002: Colegio de Dagupan was given Level 1 accreditation by the Philippine Association of Colleges and Universities Commission on Accreditation (PACUCOA) for its BS Accountancy and BS Electronics and Communications Engineering courses.
 2003: accredited Level I by the Philippine Association of Colleges and Universities Commission on Accreditation (PACUCOA) for its Bachelor of Elementary Education, Bachelor of Secondary Education, Bachelor in Science in Commerce with majors in Banking and Finance, Managerial Accounting and Management, Bachelor of Science in Computer Science and Bachelor of Science in Computer Engineering. It began offering Bachelor of Science in Nursing, and the course Caregiving.
 2004: Philippine Association of Colleges and Universities Commission on Accreditation (PACUCOA) granted Level II accreditation to the College of Education for its Bachelor of Elementary and Secondary Education courses.
 2005: Colegio de Dagupan as named now, was granted Level II Formal Accreditation Status by the Philippine Association of Colleges and Universities commission on Accreditation (PACUCOA) in Bachelor of Science in Commerce Major in Management, Managerial Accounting and Banking and Finance Program.
 2006: Colegio de Dagupan underwent CHED’s Institutional Quality Assurance Monitoring and Evaluation (IQUAME). Consequently, on November 14, 2007, Colegio de Dagupan was classified by the CHED as Category A (t) pursuant to CMO No. 15 s. 2005, the highest in the said category.
 2007: The College of Information and Computing Studies was awarded Center of Development (COD) in Information Technology, a testament of the school’s commitment to providing quality instruction, advanced research and relevant outreach and extension programs in this field. 
 2009: The Commission on Higher Education (CHED) Granted Full Deregualated Status of the Institution.
 2010: Recognized as a Center of Development (COD) in Teacher Education for exhibiting potential in providing quality instruction and research and extension services in its teacher education program.
 2011: Level III Formal accredited status in its BS in Computer Science program and Level II 2nd re-accredited status in its BS in Business Administration program after undergoing and successfully hurdling the stringent accreditation process administered by PACUCOA, last August 11–12, 2011.
 2012: Just recently, the Commission on Higher Education granted a permit to Colegio de Dagupan to offer the Expanded Tertiary Education Equivalency and Accreditation Program (ETEEAP).
 2012: The Commission on Higher Education (CHED) Granted Full Autonomous Status of the Institution.
 2022: The college was granted university status and was renamed the Universidad de Dagupan.

Admissions

Colegio de Dagupan currently has an open admissions policy to all those who wish to pursue a college education. Admission is based on the agreed academic and ethical standards as well as the student's willingness to abide by the rules, regulations and policies set by the College.

Admission of transferees from other colleges and universities shall be subject to the careful review of the credentials submitted to the College.

Research Unit
The Research and Planning Unit, headed by the Research Director under the Office of the Vice President for Academic Affairs, is a service unit that assists Colegio De Dagupan faculty, staff, and students in their research endeavors. The office is responsible for coordinating and stimulating research and development activities in the college. It is working with the faculty and staff to increase external funding and to provide opportunities for professional growth that is critical to the overall health of the institution.

The Research Director and staff provide assistance with the processing of proposals, including administrative review and sign-off, and assist with the negotiation of external agreements in coordination with the Office of External Affairs. Assistance with the development of the proposal narrative and budget is also available. The Research Unit post-award responsibilities include institutional financial management of grants, contracts, and other externally funded agreements beginning immediately after the award.

Financial aid

Policy statement

Implementation and effectivity period
This policy takes effect upon approval of the Academic Council and after every semester.

Rules and procedures

Academic scholars are selected every semester. Students who are enrolled in degree courses are eligible to qualify. The Registrar determines the students who qualify as Academic Scholars for the semester based on the computation of the final grades submitted to the office. After careful evaluation of the records of all students who qualify, the Registrar will post the list on the bulletin boards around the campus.

Since this program is highly selective, only the top three students who excel in the five colleges, in every level, will be awarded the prestigious academic scholarship. Students who top the list will enjoy the benefits of free matriculation and miscellaneous fees for the semester. The second and third students in the list will be entitled to a discount amounting to half the matriculation fee.

To qualify as an Academic Scholar, a student should have a minimum load of 18 units for the semester.

Also, the student should maintain a minimum grade of 88% for all academic subjects and a minimum of 85% for non-academic subjects (P.E. and ROTC). Moreover, a student should not have any dropped subjects.

Aid

Colegio de Dagupan provides financial assistance to all qualified students. This is some of the aid that the college grants.
 Special grants for Valedictorian and Salutatorians
 Academic entrance Scholarship Grants for High School students
 The Private Education Student Financial Assistance (PESFA)
 The Study-Now-Pay-Later Plan (SNPLP)
 The Dagupan City-Illinois Association Scholarship Grants
 The Fidel S. Arzadon Scholarship Grant
 The Felisa P. Arzadon Scholarship Grant
 The US Veterans Administration Financial Assistance Program
 The Philippine Veterans Administration Financial Assistance Program
 The GSIS Financial Assistance Program
 Philippine National Police (PNP) Dagupan City Scholarship
 Department of Science and Technology (DOST) Scholarship

Likewise, government financial grants-in-aid (instituted by the CHED Regional Office 1, San Fernando, LU) are available:
 The National Integration Study Grant Program (NISGP)
 The State Scholarship Program (SSP)
 The Selected Ethnics Group Educational Assistance Program (SEGEAP)

Student life

Student organizations
Students are given the chance to earn seats in the local political scene of the college through joining Colegio de Dagupan's Supreme Student Council (SSC) and various other accredited student organizations.

Athletics
Each College is informally represented by each team names and mascots:

 College of Information and Computing Studies: Silver Knights
 College of Engineering: (To be Updated)
 College of Health and Science: Green and Gold WildCats
 College of Arts Sciences and Education: Yellow Tigers
 College of Hotel and Restaurant Management: Red Dragons

Colegio de Dagupan one of the highly anticipated teams in the Yearly Celebrated Inter Collegiate Olympics where every school in Pangasinan and other neighboring schools battle it off for the best teams in different sporting events.

The women's teams are called the Lady Stallions, the men's teams are called Blue Stallions.

The College Chorus is called Koro Colegio.

References

External links
 

Universities and colleges in Dagupan